Jiangzhou may refer to:

Places in China formerly or currently named Jiangzhou
Jiangzhou District (江州区), Chongzuo, Guangxi
Jiangzhou Town (江州镇), town in Jiangzhou District
Jiangzhou (state) (絳州), state of the Northern Zhou in modern-day Xinjiang County, Shanxi
Chongqing Municipality, known as Jiangzhou (江州) during the State of Qin (316 BCE)
Jiangxi province, known as Jiangzhou (江州) during the Western Jin (CE 291)
 Jiangzhou Prefecture, a prefecture in modern Jiangxi, China between the 6th and 14th centuries
Jiangzhou Prefecture (Shanxi), a prefecture in modern Shanxi, China between the 6th and 20th centuries
Jiangzhou Township (江洲瑶族乡), township in Fengshan County, Guangxi

Others
Jiangzhou (fictional city) in China, featured in the television show Dwelling Narrowness